Steve Spurrier Field at Kermit Tipton Stadium is a 6,600-capacity multi-use stadium on the campus of Science Hill High School in Johnson City, Tennessee. In addition to serving as home to the Hilltoppers, the stadium played host to the East Tennessee State Buccaneers football team while their own facility was being built.

Kermit Tipton Stadium was built to replace the aging Memorial Stadium located near Howard Johnson Field.

The stadium was named for Kermit Tipton, a former head football coach at Science Hill High School, and later principal of Johnson City Junior High and Independence Hall Junior High.

References

High school football venues in the United States
Johnson City, Tennessee
Sports venues in Tennessee
Soccer venues in Tennessee
2010 establishments in Tennessee
Sports venues completed in 2010
American football venues in Tennessee
East Tennessee State Buccaneers football venues